Al-Mustazi is an impact crater located on the anti-Saturn hemisphere of Saturn's moon Enceladus.  Al-Mustazi was first observed in Cassini images during that mission's March 2005 flyby of Enceladus.  It is located at 20.9° South Latitude, 202.0° West Longitude, and is 10.3 kilometers across.  Cassini observed numerous southwest–northeast trending fractures cutting across the southwest rim of Al-Mustazi, forming canyons several hundred meters deep.  These fractures were deflected by the weakened regolith produced by the Al-Mustazi impact.  This deflection produced the pattern of radiating fractures seen along the northeastern rim of Al-Mustazi. 

Al-Mustazi is named after Az-Zahir, a 13th-century Abbasid caliph and a character in "The Hunchback's Tale" from The Book of One Thousand and One Nights.

References

Impact craters on Enceladus